Clownery (translit. Klounada) is a black-and-white and colour 1989 Soviet independent film directed by Dmitrii Frolov. It is based on Daniil Kharms novel Situations.

Plot
Various works of Daniil Kharms are filigreely connected in a single whole by means of a character dressed in a sailor's pea coat, which roams from the "case" to the "occasion", getting into various stories and leaving unscathed from the most incredible situations. The character is a nice embodiment of the revolutionary sailor in reserve, what was filled with Russian society in the early 30-ies. He is quite a good-natured "lumpen", not devoid of features of his class: impudence, self-will and unceremoniousness. In the film the works of Harms are screened: "Noise", "Victory of Myshin", "Grigoriev and Semyonov", etc.

Cast
Dmitrii Frolov as Daniil Kharms
Dmitri Shibanov as Myshin
Natalya Surkova as Marya Ivanovna
Mark Nahamkin as Pushkin

Details
 The intimate scene in "Clownery" was one of the first in the domestic cinema (a little earlier the sensational film "Little Faith" was filmed). In September 1989, when the first screening of "Clownery" for friends took place, this moment produced the effect of a bomb exploding.
 The film was looking for a long way to the viewer, and was officially released in February 2005. Counting from September 1989, the picture material was waiting for this hour for about 16 years. For as many years they waited on the mezzanines of the publication of Kharms's manuscript after his death in 1942, while Yakov Druskin did not start publishing them.
 The premiere of the film was held at the 11th Russian Film Festival "Literature and Cinema" on February 26, 2005, on the eve of the director's birthday.

Festivals

 XI Russian Film Festival "Literature and Cinema", Gatchina, February–March 2005;
 IX International Festival of Arts "Sergey Oskolkov and his friends", St. Petersburg, Peterhof, Oranienbaum, June 2005;
 International St. Petersburg "HARMS-Festival-5", St. Petersburg, Russia, June–July 2005;
 Vll International Biennale "DIALOGI", CEH Manege, St. Petersburg, August 2005;
 Club "SINEFANT", Moscow, August 17, 2005;
 8th International Festival of Independent Cinema "Clear Dreams", St. Petersburg, November 2005;
 X International Art Festival "Sergey Oskolkov and his friends", St. Petersburg, Peterhof, Oranienbaum, June 2006;
 "ARTKONCEPT 2006" - 3rd International Festival of Tendentious Art, St. Petersburg, August 2006;
 INTERZONE, St. Petersburg, July 2008
 The Flight Deck Film Festival, New York City, NY, United States, July 2020
 Global Monthly Online Film Competition, Canada, September, 2020
 Madras Independent Film Festival, Chennai, India, November, 2020
 Best Director Award, London, United Kingdom, November, 2020
 Kosice International Monthly Film Festival, Košice, Slovakia, December, 2020
 Aurora Film Festival, Caserta, Italy, November, 2020
 Cinemaking International Film Festival, Bangladesh, December, 2020
 Standalone Film Festival & Awards, Rancho Cucamonga, United States, February, 2021
 Oasis Inter Continental Film Festival, Mumbai, India, February, 2021
 Gralha International Monthly Film Awards, Curitiba, Brazil, February, 2021
 Accord Cine Fest, Mumbai, India, April, 2021
 Gutterbliss Temporary Testival, United States, May, 2021
 Continental Film Awards, India, May, 2021
 SonderBlu Film Festival, New York, United States, September, 2021
 The World's Best Self Funded Films - CPFF Qualifying Film Festival, October, 2021
 CINEMA OF NATIONS, Potsdam, Germany, December, 2021
 Paradise Film Festival, Budapest, Hungary, December, 2021
 Hamburg Film Awards, Hamburg, Germany, January, 2022
 Shiny Sparkle Independent Online Film Festival, January, 2022
 Art Gallery Film Festival, Chennai, India, February, 2022
 Hallucinea Film Festival, Paris, France, February, 2022

Awards
 Special prize "Through the thorns to the stars" for a new language in the cinema at International Festival of Independent Cinema "Clean Dreams - VIII", November 2005
 FINALIST on The Flight Deck Film Festival, New York City, NY, United States, July 2020
 Best Experimental Feature, Best Director Feature, Best Actor Feature, Best Actress Feature, Global Monthly Online Film Competition, Canada, September, 2020
 Best Experimental Feature, Best Editing at Madras Independent Film Festival, Chennai, India, November, 2020
 Best Director Experimental Film at Best Director Award, London, United Kingdom, November, 2020
 Honorable mention at Cinemaking International Film Festival, Bangladesh, December, 2020
 Best Cinematography of Feature Film 🏆 Best Sound Design/Mix of Feature Film 🏆 Best Production Design of Feature Film 🏆 Best Costume Design of Feature Film 🏆 Best Feature Film Poster at Gralha International Monthly Film Awards, Curitiba, Brazil, February, 2021
 Best Experimental Feature at Accord Cine Fest, Mumbai, India. April, 2021
 Best European Experimental Feature at Continental Film Awards, India, May, 2021
 Nominee at The World's Best Self Funded Films - CPFF Qualifying Film Festival, October, 2021
 Finalist at Shiny Sparkle Independent Online Film Festival, January, 2022
 Best Experimental Film at Art Gallery Film Festival, Chennai, India, February, 2022 
 Special Mention at Hallucinea Film Festival, Paris, France, February, 2022

References

 Official site of the film
 «Clownery» on FACEBOOK
 In the club "Sinefantom"
 About the film on the site "CINEFANTOM"
 About the film on the site "Another movie"
 Sobaka.Ru St. Petersburg in the thrash cinema
 InoyeKino 
 List of the best avant-garde films
 Movie Magic
 Films USSR 
 Daniil Kharms
 Dmitry Frolov and the editing film 
 Pushkinskaya 10. Film screening
 Kinorium
 SMAE
 letterboxd.com

Specific

1989 films
1989 in the Soviet Union
Russian independent films
Russian avant-garde and experimental films
Soviet avant-garde and experimental films
1980s Russian-language films
Soviet black-and-white films
Experimental medical treatments in fiction
Films based on works by Daniil Kharms
Films based on Russian novels
Films about size change
Films directed by Dmitrii Frolov
1989 independent films
1980s avant-garde and experimental films
Russian black-and-white films